The Spirit of Butts' Farm (also known as TAM 5) was the first model aircraft to cross the Atlantic Ocean on August 11, 2003. The aircraft was launched from Cape Spear near St. John's, Newfoundland and Labrador, and landed at Mannin Beach near Clifden, Ireland 38.9 hours later. It was recognized by the FAI as a double world record flight for its duration of 38h 52 min 19 sec and straight-line distance of  using an autopilot, and using the Argos System for telemetry to track the flight's progress; the team's use of technology also spurred the FAI to create new record categories. The aircraft was controlled by autopilot for >99% of the flight in a manner similar to that used by the Insitu Aerosonde UAV "Laima" that crossed the Atlantic in 1998. The flight used 99.2% of its fuel and left only  (or 44 minutes of flight time) remaining when it reached its destination.

The aircraft was built by a team led by Maynard Hill, a retired metallurgist. Hill had previously set 25 model airplane records and was inducted into the Model Aviation Hall of Fame in 1977. The Spirit of Butts' Farm was the 25th of 28 airframes the team had built in the attempt to cross the Atlantic; the five best models were selected for actual transatlantic flight attempts. The 25th airframe was the fifth selected for the record attempt and was redesignated TAM-5. Later, describing his reaction to learning that the flight had been successful, Hill said, "I just grabbed my wife, hugged her and cried like a baby."

The aircraft was named after R. Beecher Butts, an aviation enthusiast who allowed the use of his farm for testing of the aircraft. The name echoes that of the Spirit of St. Louis, the aircraft used by Charles Lindbergh in his transatlantic flight. The aircraft is on display at the National Model Aviation Museum. A backup plane for the transatlantic effort is in the collection of the National Air and Space Museum.

An article on the flight can be found in the October 2003 edition of Model Aviation Canada magazine.

The Society for Technical Aeromodel Research (S.T.A.R.) was organized to help support the costs of the project.

References

External links
 Official page with FAQs
 Popular Science article "World Records: The Mylar Miracle

Radio-controlled aircraft
Aviation records